Little River may refer to the following rivers in the U.S. state of Oklahoma:

 Little River (Canadian River)
 Little River (Red River), also in Arkansas